Polyptychus rougeoti is a moth of the family Sphingidae. It is known from Gabon.

The forewings are long and narrow, apex acute. The ground colour of the upperside is wood brown, mottled with olive yellow at the costa, the inner margin and in the subapical area. There is a large dark olive basal spot, and a paler olive spot at the inner margin and a triangular olive spot at the costa, before the apex. The underside of the forewings is wood brown, but much paler towards outer margin. The upperside of the hindwings is wood brown, paler at the tornus, where there is a dark brown spot. There is a long brown streak parallel to inner margin.

References

Endemic fauna of Gabon
Polyptychus
Moths described in 1968
Fauna of Gabon
Moths of Africa